The Central District of Meybod County is in Yazd province, Iran. At the National Census in 2006, its population was 70,728 in 19,076 households. The following census in 2011 counted 82,840 people in 23,300 households. At the latest census in 2016, the district had 85,771 inhabitants in 25,366 households.

References 

Meybod County

Districts of Yazd Province

Populated places in Yazd Province

Populated places in Meybod County